Nymphicula nyasalis is a species of moth of the family Crambidae. It was described by George Hampson in 1917. It is found in the Republic of the Congo, Malawi and Tanzania.

The wingspan is 9–14 mm. The base of the forewings is fuscous. There is an orange subbasal fascia followed by a whitish fascia, separated by fuscous scales. The hindwings are whitish, irrorated (sprinkled) with fuscous.

References

Moths described in 1917
Nymphicula